The Statue of Lenin in Berdychiv (in Ukrainian: Пам'ятник Леніну В. І.) was a sculpture monument to the revolutionary Vladimir Lenin, located in Berdychiv, Ukraine.

The monument ID is 18-104-0031.

It was toppled and destroyed during the Euromaidan on February 22, 2014.

See also 
 Demolition of monuments to Vladimir Lenin in Ukraine
 List of statues of Vladimir Lenin

References

External links 
 

Destroyed sculptures
Statues in Ukraine
Demolished buildings and structures in Ukraine
Sculptures in the Soviet Union
Buildings and structures demolished in 2014
Monuments and memorials to Vladimir Lenin
Decommunization in Ukraine
1982 establishments in Ukraine
2014 disestablishments in Ukraine
Sculptures of men in Ukraine
Granite sculptures
Outdoor sculptures in Ukraine
Removed statues
Statues removed in 2014